Cristo Rey San José Jesuit High School is a private Catholic high school, located in  San Jose, California, in the United States. Founded by the California Province of the Society of Jesus in 2014, the school is a member of the Cristo Rey Network of work-study schools for students from low-income families.

See also

 Catholic Church in the United States
 Education in California
 List of Jesuit schools

References

External links 
 Cristo Rey Network

Jesuit high schools in the United States
Private schools in San Jose, California
Educational institutions established in 2014
Cristo Rey Network
Catholic secondary schools in California
2014 establishments in California